This is a survey of the postage stamps and postal history of Seychelles, a 115 island nation spanning an archipelago in the Indian Ocean, some  east of mainland Africa, northeast of the island of Madagascar. Seychelles was administered as a dependency of Mauritius from 1810 to 1903. Independence was granted in 1976.

First mails
From 1848, stamps of Mauritius were used on mail from Seychelles and are found with the cancel B64 from that year.

The first post office in the Seychelles was opened at Victoria, on Mahe, on 11 December 1861 and stamps of Mauritius were used there until 1890. The next post office in Seychelles was not opened until 1901.

First stamps of Seychelles

The first stamps marked Seychelles were issued on 5 April 1890 and were of a Queen Victoria key type design. A number of different issues followed, all of the same design, including surcharges in 1893 and 1901.

King Edward VII & King George V
Further key type stamps were issued for these monarchs from 1906.

King George VI

In 1937, Seychelles participated in the omnibus stamp issue for the coronation of King George VI and three stamps were issued. In 1938 a distinctive series of definitive stamps were issued, printed in photogravure by Harrison & Sons which marked a departure in the design of British colonial stamps. The stamps were reissued in 1952 with a new portrait of the King with a crown over it.

Queen Elizabeth II

In 1953, Seychelles participated in the omnibus stamp issue for the coronation of Queen Elizabeth II and one stamp was issued. In 1954, the definitive stamps of 1938 were revised to include the head of Queen Elizabeth II. Regular commemorative and definitive stamp issues have followed. The head of Queen Elizabeth II, or the Initials E II R, were dropped from Seychelles stamps on independence in 1976.

Gallery 
The same stamp of Seychelles as originally issued in 1938 for King George VI, with revised head 1952, and for Queen Elizabeth II, 1954. All photogravure, Harrison & Sons.

Zil Eloigne Sesel, Zil Elwagne Sesel and Zil Elwannyen Sesel

Stamps marked Zil Eloigne Sesel (1980-1982), Zil Elwagne Sesel (1982-1984) and Zil Elwannyen Sesel (1985-1992) were issued for the Seychelles outer islands of Aldabra, Coetivy, Farquhar and Amirante. These islands were served by the travelling post office on the M.V. Cinq-Juin. Issues ceased in 1992.

See also
Revenue stamps of Seychelles

References

Further reading
 Farmer, H.V. Seychelles: Postage Stamps and Postal History. London: Robson Lowe Ltd., 1955 123p.
 Harris, Leslie. The Stamps and Postal History of Seychelles: a colour illustrated handbook. London: G.T. Phillips & Co. (London) Ltd., 1971 44p.
 Hopson, Sue. Seychelles: Postal History and Postage Stamps to 1976. Weybridge: Indian Ocean Study Circle, 2002  172p. An update to the volume was published 2002 by the Indian Ocean Study Circle; S. Hopson & B.M. McCloy, co-authors and editors.
 Poole, Bertram W.H. The Postage Stamps of the Seychelles. London: Oswald Marsh, 1906 64p.

External links

King George VI stamps of Seychelles

Philately of Seychelles
Philately of Mauritius